Grant Shaw (born August 3, 1984) is a professional Canadian football placekicker and punter who is currently a free agent. He was drafted eleventh overall by the Toronto Argonauts in the 2010 CFL Draft and signed with the team on May 22, 2010. He played college football for the Saskatchewan Huskies football team, where he was named a Canada West All-Star for playing defensive back in 2009.

Professional career
Shaw began his rookie season with the Argonauts as the team's starting placekicker before being replaced by Justin Medlock and later Noel Prefontaine due to inaccuracy. Shaw remained on the Argonauts roster for the rest of the season as a backup kicker, punter and linebacker and coverage man on special teams. In the final game of the regular season vs. Montreal, Shaw handled both kicking and punting duties after Noel Prefontaine pulled a muscle during pre-game warm-ups. Shaw hit three of four field goals, including field goals from 47 and 52 yards, and each of the four extra points he attempted, and averaged 49 yards on five punts.

On December 12, 2011, Shaw was traded to the Edmonton Eskimos, along with Steven Jyles and a 2012 first round draft pick, for Ricky Ray.

References

External links
Edmonton Eskimos' player bio 

1984 births
Living people
Canadian football placekickers
Edmonton Elks players
Saskatchewan Huskies football players
Toronto Argonauts players
Players of Canadian football from Alberta
Canadian football people from Edmonton